A vehicle-ramming attack is an assault in which a perpetrator deliberately rams a vehicle into a building, crowd of people, or another vehicle. According to Stratfor Global Intelligence analysts, this attack represents a relatively new militant tactic that could prove more difficult to prevent than suicide bombings.

Deliberate vehicle-ramming into a crowd of people is a tactic used by terrorists, becoming a major terrorist tactic in the 2010s because it requires little skill to perpetrate, cars and trucks are widely available, and it has the potential to cause significant casualties. Deliberate vehicle-ramming has also been carried out in the course of other types of crimes, including road rage incidents. Deliberate vehicle-ramming incidents have also sometimes been ascribed to the driver's psychiatric disorder.

Vehicles have also been used by attackers to breach buildings with locked gates, before detonating explosives, as in the Saint-Quentin-Fallavier attack.

Causes and motives

Ease 
According to the U.S. Federal Bureau of Investigation, the tactic has gained popularity because "Vehicle ramming offers terrorists with limited access to explosives or weapons an opportunity to conduct a homeland attack with minimal prior training or experience." Vehicles are as easy to acquire as knives, but unlike knives, which may arouse suspicion if found in one's possession, vehicles are essential for daily life, and the capability of vehicles to cause casualties if used aggressively is underestimated.

Islamic terrorism 
Counterterrorism researcher Daveed Gartenstein-Ross of the Foundation for Defense of Democracies told Slate that the tactic has been on the rise in Israel because, "the security barrier is fairly effective, which makes it hard to get bombs into the country." In 2010, Inspire, the online, English-language magazine produced by al-Qaeda in the Arabian Peninsula urged mujahideen to choose "pedestrian only" locations and make sure to gain speed before ramming their vehicles into the crowd in order to "achieve maximum carnage".

Vehicle attacks can be carried out by lone-wolf terrorists who are inspired by an ideology but who are not working within a specific political movement or group. Writing for The Daily Beast, Jacob Siegel suggests that the perpetrator of the 2014 Couture-Rouleau attack may be "the kind of terrorist the West could be seeing a lot more of in the future", a kind that he describes, following Brian Jenkins of the Rand Corporation, as "stray dogs", rather than lone wolves, characterizing them as "misfits" who are "moved from seething anger to spontaneous deadly action" by exposure to Islamist propaganda. A 2014 propaganda video by ISIL encouraged French sympathizers to use cars to run down civilians.

According to Clint Watts, of the Foreign Policy Research Institute, where he is a senior fellow and expert on terrorism, the older model where members of groups like al-Qaeda would "plan and train together before going to carry out an attack, became defunct around 2005", due to increased surveillance by Western security agencies. Watts says that Anwar al-Awlaki, the American-born al-Qaeda imam, as a key figure in this shift, addressing English-speakers in their language and urging them to "Do your own terrorism and stay in place."

Jamie Bartlett, who heads the Violence and Extremism Program at Demos, a British think tank, explains that "the internet in the last few years has both increased the possibilities and the likelihood of lone-wolf terrorism," supplying isolated individuals with ideological motivation and technique. For authorities in Western countries, the difficulty is that even in a case like that of the perpetrator of the 2014 Couture-Rouleau attack, where Canadian police had identified the attacker, taken away his passport, and were working with his family and community to steer him away from jihad, vehicle attacks can be hard to prevent because, "it's very difficult to know exactly what an individual is planning to do before a crime is committed. We cannot arrest someone for thinking radical thoughts; it's not a crime in Canada."

According to Stratfor, the American global intelligence firm, "while not thus far as deadly as suicide bombing", this tactic could prove more difficult to prevent. No single group has claimed responsibility for the incidents. Experts see a saving grace in the ignorance and incompetence of most lone-wolf terrorists, who often manage to murder very few people.

Protest encounters 
Vehicular ramming has sometimes been advocated to attack protesters who block public roadways in the United States. Two police officers were suspended and fired in January and June 2016, respectively, for tweeting such advice about Black Lives Matter rallies, which have sometimes been broken up by cars. North Dakota state legislator Keith Kempenich tried and failed to pass a law granting civil immunity to drivers who accidentally hit activists after his mother-in-law was stopped by Dakota Access Pipeline protesters, and Tennessee Senator Bill Ketron did likewise after a man hit an anti-Trump group. Similar legislation has been introduced in Florida and Texas. After the white supremacist Unite the Right rally, in which an anti-fascist protester was killed in a vehicle ramming attack, media outlets Fox News and The Daily Caller deleted videos which encouraged driving through crowds of protesters.

Protective measures

Security bollards are credited with minimizing damage and casualties in the 2007 Glasgow Airport attack, and with preventing ramming in the 2014 Alon Shvut stabbing attack, leading the assailant to abandon his car and attack pedestrians waiting at a bus stop with a knife, after his effort to run them over was thwarted. However, Berlin's police chief, Klaus Kandt, argued that bollards would not have prevented the 2016 Berlin truck attack, and that the required security measures would be "varied, complex, and far from a panacea".

On 23 October 2014, the US National Institute of Building Sciences updated its Building Design Guideline on Crash- and Attack-Resistant Models of bollards, a guideline written to help professionals design bollards to protect facilities from vehicle operators, "who plan or carry out acts of property destruction, incite terrorism, or cause the deaths of civilian, industrial or military populations". The American Bar Association recommends bollards as effective protection against car-ramming attacks.

In January 2018, it was announced by the then mayor of New York City, Bill de Blasio, that the city planned to install 1,500 steel street barriers to prevent vehicle attacks. This came after the city's two vehicle-ramming attacks in 2017 killed nine people.

Münster has been planning to install security bollards in public areas in response to vehicle-ramming attacks in European cities, including the Berlin attack. While only selected locations can be protected this way, tight bends and restricted-width streets may also prevent a large vehicle getting speed before reaching a barrier.

Modern Internet-connected drive-by-wire cars can potentially be hacked remotely and used for such attacks. To demonstrate the severity of this type of attack, 2015 hackers remotely carjacked a Jeep from 10 miles away and drove it into a ditch. Measures for cybersecurity of automobiles to prevent such attacks are often criticized as being insufficient.

List of attacks

Terrorism

In chronological order:

 1981 Iraqi embassy bombing, Beirut, Lebanon (building ramming and exploding)
 1982 IDF Headquarters bombing, Tyre (building ramming and exploding)
 1983 US embassy bombing, Beirut
 1983 Beirut barracks bombings, Beirut, Lebanon, (building ramming and exploding)
 1983 Shin Bet Headquarters building, Tyre (building ramming and exploding)
 1983 US embassy bombing, Kuweit
 1984 US embassy bombing, Beirut
 1987 Army camp bombing, Sri Lanka (building ramming and exploding)
 1998 Temple of the Tooth attack, Sri Lanka (building ramming and exploding)
 1999 Ibar Highway assassination attempt, FR Yugoslavia (assassination attempt)
 September 11 attacks, New York City and Arlington County, Virginia (planes flown into buildings)
 2001 Azor attack, Israel (ramming people, mostly soldiers)
 2001 Jammu and Kashmir legislative assembly car bombing (building gate ramming and exploding and gunfire)
 2002 Lyon car attack, France (building ramming and fire)
 2004 Granby Colorado rampage (modified bulldozer)
 2006 UNC SUV attack, University of North Carolina, United States (ramming people)
 2007 Glasgow Airport attack, Scotland (building ramming and detonating gas cylinders)
 2008 Kashgar attack, China (ramming people, stabbing, exploding)
 2008 Jerusalem vehicular attack, Israel (ramming vehicles and people)
 2 July 2008 Jerusalem bulldozer attack, Israel (ramming people)
 22 July 2008 Jerusalem bulldozer attack, Israel (ramming people)
 2009 Jerusalem attack, Israel (ramming people)
 2009 Jerusalem bulldozer attack, Israel (ramming people)
 2011 Tel Aviv truck attack, Israel (ramming vehicles and people)
 2011 Tel Aviv nightclub attack, Israel (ramming and stabbing)
 2011 Kashgar attacks, China (ramming people, stabbing, exploding)
 May 2013 Murder of Lee Rigby, London, England, (ramming and stabbing)
 2013 Tiananmen Square attack, China (ramming people and bursting into flames)
 2013 Iranian embassy bombing
 May 2014 Ürümqi attack, China (ramming and throwing bombs off the vehicle)
 2014 Jerusalem tractor attack, Israel (ramming people and bus)
 2014 Saint-Jean-sur-Richelieu ramming attack, Canada (ramming)
 October 2014 Jerusalem vehicular attack, Israel (ramming people)
 November 2014 Jerusalem vehicular attack, Israel (ramming and hitting with a metal crowbar)
 2014 Alon Shvut stabbing attack, West Bank (failed ramming and stabbing)
 2016 Nice truck attack, France (86 killed, ramming people and gunfire)
 2016 Ohio State University attack, United States (ramming and stabbing)
 2016 Berlin truck attack, Germany (shooting truck driver and ramming people; 13 killed)
 2017 Jerusalem truck attack, Israel (ramming people; 4 killed)
 January 2017 Melbourne car attack, Australia (Ramming people, 6 killed).
 2017 Westminster attack, London, England, United Kingdom  (ramming and stabbing; some victims were thrown off Westminster Bridge by the ramming; 5 killed)
 2017 Stockholm truck attack, Sweden (ramming people; 5 killed)
 2017 London Bridge attack, England, United Kingdom (ramming and stabbing; 8 killed)
 2017 Finsbury Park attack, London, England, United Kingdom (ramming people; 1 killed)
 June 2017 Champs-Élysées car ramming attack, Paris, France (ramming a police car; 1 attacker killed)
 2017 Levallois-Perret attack, Levallois-Perret, France (ramming soldiers; none killed)
 2017 Barcelona attacks, Barcelona, Spain (ramming, stabbing and bombings; 16 killed 152 injured)

 2017 Charlottesville attack, during the Unite the Right rally in Charlottesville, Virginia, United States (ramming people; 1 killed)
 2017 New York City truck attack (ramming cyclists and runners; 8 killed)
 2018 Terrorist attack against cyclists in Tajikistan (ramming and stabbing)
 2018 Westminster car attack (ramming pedestrians and cyclists before crashing into security barriers; none killed)
 2019 Pulwama attack
 2019 Tokyo car attack
 2020 Colombes car attack
 2021 Yangon military vehicle attack, Yangon, Myanmar
 2022 Beersheba attack (ramming and stabbing)
 November 2022 Ariel attack
 2023 Ramot Junction attack in Jerusalem
 2023 Huwara shooting, in the West Bank

Suspected terrorism
 2017 Edmonton attack, Canada (ramming + stabbing; none killed)
 December 2017 Melbourne car attack (ramming and stabbing, 1 killed)
 2019 Taneytown, Maryland (ramming building)
 2020 Negohot. 1 Israeli soldier was wounded, and the assailant was shot dead.
 2021 London, Ontario truck attack: A 20-year-old man rammed with his truck against random Muslim pedestrians, killing a family of four and wounding a boy. The attacker was arrested for murder, charged with a hate crime, and investigated for terrorism.
2021 Lakhimpur Kheri massacre: Eight killed in farmers' protest in Lakhimpur Kheri district; Ashish Mishra, the son of Union Minister of State Ajay Mishra, was allegedly driving one of the three cars.

Other

 1953 Elias Antonio case, Syrian merchant who killed one person and wounded up to 29 others in Bento Ribeiro, Rio de Janeiro, Brazil when ramming his car into a carnival block
 1964 Taipei attack (ramming people)
 1973 Olga Hepnarová case, Czechoslovakian woman using a truck to go on a rampage; 8 dead, 12 injured.
 1973 Plains attack (ramming people)
 1974 Eugen Grigore case, Romanian man drives cargo truck into Gypsy nomad encampment; 24 dead, around 50 injured
 1980 Wantagh attack (ramming people)
 1982 Beijing attack (ramming people). 5 dead, 19 injured.
 1982 Langfang attack (ramming and stabbing). 13 dead, 17 injured.
 1983 Changde massacre (ramming people). Deadliest vehicular rampage killing in history. 21 dead, 29 injured.
 1983 Douglas Crabbe drove a 25-tonne Mack truck into the crowded bar of a motel at the base of Uluru on 18 August 1983. Five people were killed, and sixteen were seriously injured.
 1983 Beirut barracks bombings, Lebanon (building ramming and exploding)
 1984 Los Angeles attack (ramming people)
 1993 Jacarepaguá attack (ramming people)
 1995 New York City attack (ramming and stabbing).
 1995 Shawn Nelson case, a plumber using a stolen tank to go on a rampage
 1998 Putian 26-day spree ramming.
 1999 Emiko Taira (mother of Japanese pop singer Namie Amuro) and her husband Tatsunobu Taira were walking along a road near National Highway No. 58 in Ōgimi, Okinawa Prefecture, Japan when Tatsunobu's brother Kenji Taira backed his car into a telephone pole and ran over the couple on 17 March 1999. Emiko Taira was killed. Kenji Taira later committed suicide.
 1999 Shimonoseki Station massacre (ramming and stabbing)
2001 The Hamptons rampage, socialite Lizzie Grubman rams into a crowd outside a club with SUV (16 injured).
 2001 Kampala attack (ramming people)
 2001 Dalian attack (ramming people). 1 dead, and 18 were injured.
 2001 Shenzhen attack (ramming and stabbing). 8 dead and 4−7 injured.
 2002 New York City attack (ramming people).
 2002 San Cristóbal Ecatepec attack (ramming people).
 2002 Murder of David Lynn Harris
 2003 Düsseldorf attack (ramming people)
 2003 A psychologically unstable person kills one and hurts eighteen in Stockholm's old town. A second death later occurs in a hospital.
 2004 Marvin Heemeyer case, a welder using an armored bulldozer to destroy buildings
 2005 Las Vegas attack (ramming people)
 2006 Dublin attack (ramming people)
 2006 Berlin attack (ramming people during soccer championship, found insane)
 2006 Shenzhen attack (ramming and stabbing)
 2006 San Francisco SUV rampage, 2006 case of a paranoid schizophrenic man from Afghanistan using an SUV to go on a rampage
 2007 Berrwiller attack (ramming people)
 2008 Akihabara massacre, mass murder using a truck and a dagger 
 2009 attack on the Dutch royal family (ramming people, attempt to attack the Dutch royals including the reigning monarch; 8 killed)
 2010 Zhengzhou attack (ramming people). 6 dead, 20 injured.
 2010 Hebei tractor rampage, 2010 mass murder using a bucket loader
 2011 Changsha attack (ramming people). 5 dead, 5 injured.
 2012 Pune attack (ramming people)
 2012 Zhangjiajie attack (ramming people). 6 dead, 9 injured.
 2012 Cardiff Hit and Run Rampage Matthew Tvrdon, under a psychotic episode, got angry with a woman and began ramming her and numerous pedestrians with his van over eight miles for 30 minutes, killing Karina Menzies and injuring 12 others. He admitted manslaughter on the grounds of diminished responsibility and is detained indefinitely under the Mental Health Act.
 2012 Fengning attack (ramming people)
 2013 Tumon
 2013 Venice, Los Angeles (one dead)
 2014 Venezuelan protests, several cases of vehicle ramming during opposition protests by government supporters.
 2014 Isla Vista killings; Vehicle ramming attack, Stabbings, Shootings. 7 Dead.
 2014 Sopot attack, Poland (ramming people)
 2014 Taipei attack against Presidential Office Building, Taiwan
 2014 Huaiwangtan attack (ramming and stabbing)
 2014 Balipo attack (ramming and stabbing)
 2014 Dijon attack, France (ramming people)
 2014 Nantes attack, France (ramming people)
2014 Roppongi(Japan) Vehicle ramming attack(using a bicycle) and Violent Deeds.(Counter-Racist Action Collective(c.r.a.c) members attacking against Zaitokukai demonstration.)
 2015 Graz attack, mass murder using an SUV and a knife
 2015 Weifang attack (ramming people). 5 dead, 21 injured.
 2015 Shuozhou attack (ramming people) 
 2016 Yichun attack (ramming people). 4 dead, 18 injured.
 2016 Kalamazoo bicycle crash, 5 dead
 2016 Scunthorpe road rage
 2017 Venezuelan protests, several cases of vehicle rammings during opposition protests by security forces or government supporters, including the killing of Paúl Moreno.
 January 2017 Melbourne car attack in Melbourne, Australia in which six people were killed and 36 injured.
 2017 Balneário Camboriú road rage
 2017 Times Square car attack
 2017 Heidelberg attack by mentally disturbed German student
 2017 Müllrose, Germany, drug addict kills two cops while fleeing in stolen car after stabbing his grandmother to death
 2017 Antwerp attack, failed car-ramming in Belgium
 2017 Guatemala City, a car rammed into a student protest: 13 injured, one dead.
 2017 Sandy, Utah attack, car-ramming and shooting in Sandy, Utah
 2017 Jingjiang car attack (ramming people). 4 dead, 9 injured.
 2017 Columbia attack (ramming people)
 July 2017 Helsinki attack, Finland, ramming people
 August 2017 Helsinki attack, Finland, failed ramming
 2017 Chomutov incident, the Czech Republic, in which a driver was shot dead by an armed citizen after driving into a group of people 
 2017 Sept-Sorts car attack, France, ramming a pizzeria, killing a schoolgirl
2017 Marseille van attack, France. A van rammed into two bus stops killing one woman and injuring another.
 December 2017 car attack in Perth, Australia, with one dead, four injured, three seriously.
 February 2018 car attack in Perth, Australia, with two injured, in suburban Mullaloo.
 2018 Münster vehicle ramming (ramming crowd at an outdoor café, killing four and injuring 23; perpetrator then took his own life)
 2018 Toronto van attack (ramming people; 11 killed and 15 injured)
 2018 Gravesend attack (ramming people)
 2018 Bessemer City, NC vehicle ramming
 2018 Yantai attack (ramming people).
 2018 Liuzhou attack (ramming and stabbing). 6 dead, 12 injured.
 2018 Moscow attack (ramming people).
 2018 Mishui vehicle attack (ramming people at a square, killing 15 people and injuring 43 others; perpetrator sentenced to death)
 2018 Ningbo attack (ramming and stabbing). 3 dead, 15 injured.
 2018 Brăila attack, Romania. Attacker was under effects of drugs.
 2018 Newport Wales Hit and Run 4 injured on 29 April when a teen driver smashed into a crowd outside a nightclub claiming to try to stop a brawl, then fled and set his car on fire. He was found guilty of two counts of grievous bodily harm with intent, while two other teens pled guilty for their role in instigating the fight which preceded the attack.
 2018 Huludao vehicle ramming (ramming people). 6 dead, 17 injured.
 2019 Zaoyang car attack (ramming and stabbing). 6 dead, 8 injured. 
 2019 Oberhausen, Bottrop and Essen car attack (ramming people). 8 injured.
August 2020 attack: Iraqi chases motor cyclists on Berlin's A100; trial for attempted murder to begin April 15.
 2020 July 6 Seattle: During a protest against police brutality and the murder of George Floyd 1 dead and 1 injured
 2020 Henstedt-Ulzburg ramming attack
 2020 Trier attack, Germany. Five people were killed and 30 were injured after a drunk man, who suffered from mental health problems, rammed civilians on a street.
 2021 Portland, Oregon ramming attack, one pedestrian killed and five others wounded. Driver arrested.
 2021 Novara ramming, Italy. Driver intentionally rammed workers protesting outside a market. One worker was killed, and two others were wounded.
2021 Lakhimpur-Kheri Massacre in India. A Convoy of BJP ministers mowed down four protesting farmers. In retaliation, farmers killed four people from the convoy.

Motive not yet determined
 December 2017 Melbourne car attack in Melbourne, Australia in which 18 were injured and one person died.
 2019 Tokyo car attack (ramming and stabbing and attempted kerosene arson attacks). 8 people were injured by vehicle ramming, with another person also injured after the attacker struck him while getting out of the car. The suspect claims that the attack was in retaliation for the execution of Aum Shinrikyo doomsday cult members.
2020 Volkmarsen ramming attack: On 24 February 2020, a 29-year-old man rammed his car against civilians at a carnival parade in Volkmarsen, Germany, wounding 122 people. The motive behind the attack is unknown.
2021 United States Capitol car attack: On 2 April 2021, a car ramming occurred outside the United States Capitol, killing a police officer and injuring another. Police shot and killed the perpetrator shortly after.
Killing of Deona M. Knajdek: A driver killed one person and injured three on June 13, 2021, in the U.S. city of Minneapolis.
June 2021 Fort Lauderdale, Florida Pride Parade: A pickup truck driver killed one person and injured another on 19 June 2021. All three individuals were connected with the Fort Lauderdale Gay Men's Chorus.
June 2021 Show Low, Arizona Bicycle Race: A driver struck 7 cyclists. The driver fled the scene and was pursued and shot by police.
2021 Waukesha Christmas parade attack: Darrell Brooks, of Milwaukee, broke through barricades with a red SUV and drove through the annual Waukesha Christmas parade, killing six people and injuring 62 others. Brooks was charged with 81 felony and two misdemeanor counts.
 February 2022 "A 42yr old male is facing charges after driving through a group of protesters that were part of the Freedom Convoy at the Legislative grounds," the Winnipeg Police tweeted Saturday. "4 adult males were struck."
Weng Sor, a 62-year-old Maylasian man, drove a rented U-Haul truck into pedestrians in Brooklyn, killing 1. He is placed on suicide watch after his arrest.
2023 Laval daycare bus crash: Pierre Ny St-Amand, a 51 year-old Société de transport de Laval (STL) bus driver, crashed his bus into a daycare in Laval, Quebec, killing two children and injuring six people.
2023 Amqui truck attack: Steeve Gagnon, 38 year-old, drove his pickup truck into pedestrians in Amqui, Quebec, killing three people and injuring eight.

Notes

See also
 Ram-raiding
 Vehicular homicide
 Vehicular suicide
 Mass murder
 Stabbing as a terrorist tactic
 List of rampage killers (vehicular homicide)

References

External links 
 
 In Harm's Way: Vehicle rammings against protesters are on the rise, but the justice system often sides with drivers - Boston Globe investigation

Car crime
Murders by motor vehicle
Terrorism tactics
 
Traffic collisions
Traffic law
 
Terrorism by method
Articles containing video clips
Killings by type
Road safety
Road transport